RMS Transylvania was a British Ocean Liner. She was launched on 11 March 1925 for the Anchor Line and was the sister ship to the SS California, and RMS Caledonia. She was converted into an armed merchant cruiser, pennant F56 during World War II. On 10 August 1940, HMS Transylvania was torpedoed and sunk by the German U-boat .

History

Construction

Transylvania was built in Glasgow, Scotland, by the Fairfield company, Yard No. 595. Transylvania had three funnels but only required one; three funnels were more visually appealing and attracted more passengers than her similar-looking fleetmates which only had one funnel each.

Ocean Liner Career

Transylvania was completed on 2 September 1925 and sailed from Glasgow to New York on her maiden voyage ten days later. Transylvania could carry 279 passengers in First Class, 344 in Second Class and 800 in Third Class for a total of 1,423 people. In Cherbourg, she disembarked her passengers and then sailed to the Clyde for repairs. In 1930, there was a change in ship passenger accommodation with the increase in international tourism.

Second World War
In September 1939, the liner was requisitioned by the Royal Navy as an armed merchant cruiser and Transylvania was assigned to the 10th Cruiser Squadron and served in the Northern Patrol, which was responsible for the naval blockade against the Germans. Transylvania was towed by the stern but sank before reaching land. A total of 36 people died.

References

Bibliography
 

 

Ocean liners
World War II Auxiliary cruisers of the Royal Navy
Ships sunk by German submarines in World War II
1925 ships
Maritime incidents in August 1940
World War II shipwrecks in the Atlantic Ocean